Wendy Maria Carrillo Dono is an American politician serving in the California State Assembly. A Democrat, she represents the 51st State Assembly district, encompassing parts of northeastern Los Angeles and East Los Angeles. She was sworn into office by Assembly Speaker Anthony Rendon on December 16, 2017. Prior to becoming a member of the California State Assembly, she was a multimedia journalist and labor activist.

Early life and education 
Wendy Carrillo was born in El Salvador on August 10, 1980, the oldest of five daughters. Her mother immigrated to the United States when Carrillo was a child, as she felt it was unsafe to remain in El Salvador due to civil war. Carrillo's mother worked as a babysitter. From this, she was able to save enough money to bring Carrillo, along with Carrillo's grandmother and aunt, to the United States. She moved to Los Angeles at age 5, and grew up in Boyle Heights and City Terrace. She received residency at age 13 after her father petitioned for her. At age 21, she applied to become a naturalized citizen and was granted citizenship.

Carrillo attended Harrison Elementary, El Sereno Middle School and Roosevelt High. She is a graduate of both East Los Angeles College and Cal State Los Angeles. Carrillo earned a master's degree, with an emphasis in demography and politics, from the University of Southern California.

Earlier career 
For ten years, she was the host and executive producer of a community based program called "Knowledge is Power" on KPWR 106 FM. The talk show covered topics such as environmental justice, access to higher education and politics. Carillo also worked as a writer and producer for Nuvo TV. She was also a regular contributor to Pivot's Take Part Live, Huff Post Live, The Young Turks’ The Point and Al Jazeera America.

In 2014, she was the co-founder of now defunct Reported.ly, which was a social media startup that aimed at covering issues of conflict, human rights and political movements. She was also a communications manager for labor union called Local 271, the Los Angeles affiliate of Service Employees International Union.

In 2017, Carrillo announced her intention to run to replace then Congressman Xavier Becerra following his appointment to Attorney General of California. Carrillo ultimately received 5% and lost to then State Assemblyman Jimmy Gomez and attorney Robert Lee Ahn. Gomez defeated Lee Ahn, receiving 60.1% of the vote and was formally sworn in on July 11, 2017.

California State Assembly 
Following Gomez's resignation to be formally seated in the United States House of Representatives, Carrillo announced that she would run to replace Gomez in the California State Assembly. On October 3, 2017, Carrillo received 22.2% of the vote and secured a spot in the general election. Carrillo faced Planned Parenthood – Los Angeles board member Luis Lopez. On December 5, 2017, Carrillo defeated Lopez, receiving 53.5% of the vote.

In 2018, Carrillo faced libertarian adjunct professor Christopher Stare. Carrillo easily defeated Stare, receiving 86.6% of the vote. In 2020, Carrillo ran unopposed in both the primary and general election.

Electoral history

2017 special election

2018

2020

References

External links 
 
 Campaign website
 Join California Wendy Carrillo

Democratic Party members of the California State Assembly
Living people
21st-century American politicians
Women state legislators in California
American politicians of Salvadoran descent
Hispanic and Latino American state legislators in California
Hispanic and Latino American women in politics
Women trade unionists
Service Employees International Union people
American trade unionists
1980 births
21st-century American women politicians
Salvadoran emigrants to the United States